Harmon is an unincorporated community in Red River Parish, Louisiana, United States.

Notes

Unincorporated communities in Louisiana
Unincorporated communities in Red River Parish, Louisiana
Populated places in Ark-La-Tex